The 15th Legislative Assembly of Assam constituted after the 2021 Assam Legislative Assembly elections which were concluded in April 2021, with the results being declared on 2 May 2021. The term of the previous Fourteenth Legislative Assembly of Assam ended on 31 May 2021.

Members of Legislative Assembly 

Source:

References

 
 
Assam